An assassination market is a prediction market where any party can place a bet (using anonymous electronic money and pseudonymous remailers) on the date of death of a given individual, and collect a payoff if they "guess" the date accurately. This would incentivise assassination of individuals because the assassin, knowing when the action would take place, could profit by making an accurate bet on the time of the subject's death. Because the payoff is for accurately picking the date rather than performing the action of the assassin, it is substantially more difficult to assign criminal liability for the assassination.

History 

Early uses of the terms "assassination market" and "market for assassinations" can be found (in both positive and negative lights) in 1994's "The Cyphernomicon" by Timothy C. May, a cypherpunk. The concept and its potential effects are also referred to as assassination politics, a term popularized by Jim Bell in his 1995–96 essay of the same name.

Early in part 1, Jim Bell describes the idea as:

Bell then goes on to further specify the protocol of the assassination market in more detail. In the final part of his essay, Bell posits a market that is largely non-anonymous. He contrasts this version with the one previously described. Carl Johnson's attempt to popularise the concept of assassination politics appeared to rely on the earlier version. There followed an attempt to popularise the second in 2001 that is ongoing today.

Technologies like Tor and Bitcoin have enabled online assassination markets as described in parts one to nine of Assassination Politics.

Assassination Market website 
The first prediction market entitled 'Assassination Market' was created by a self-described crypto-anarchist in 2013. Utilising Tor to hide the site's location and Bitcoin based bounties and prediction technology, the site lists bounties on US President Barack Obama, economist Ben Bernanke and former justice minister of Sweden Beatrice Ask.  In 2015 the site was suspected to be defunct, but the  deposited Bitcoins were cashed out in 2018.

See also 
 Dark web
 Darknet market
 Dead pool
 Policy Analysis Market
 Tontine
Popular culture
 The Assassination Bureau, Ltd, an unfinished novel by Jack London
 The Visit
 "Hated in the Nation", an episode of Black Mirror
 The Ankh-Morpork Assassins' Guild

References

Further reading

External links 
 Jim Bell's Assassination Politics essay at the Internet Archive (Mirror)
 The Usenet discussion containing the initial publication of the first part of Assassination Politics at Google Groups
 Academic discussion of assassination markets from an anarchist perspective at the Internet Archive

Crypto-anarchism
Prediction markets
Anarcho-capitalism
Homicide